The Nilufer or Niloufer River is a river in Turkey.

The Nilufer was the classical Odrysses. Its plain was known as Mygdonia and formed the Persian satrapy of Dascylium. It formerly flowed into the Rhyndacus but now joins the Simav (ancient Macestos) north of Karacabey.

In Turkish, nilüfer means "water lily." The river may have been renamed for the flowers or for Nilüfer Hatun, a wife of the Ottoman sultan Orhan I. The district of Nilüfer in Bursa Province is named after the river.

Today, the Doğancı-1 Dam crosses it.

References

Rivers of Turkey
Landforms of Bursa Province